Krananda semihyalina is a moth of the family Geometridae first described by Frederic Moore in 1868. It is found from the Oriental tropics to Japan, Sulawesi and the southern Moluccas.

The wingspan is 39–44 mm.

External links

"スカシエダシャク Krananda semihyalina Moore, 1868". Japanese Moths. Retrieved February 6, 2019.

Boarmiini
Moths of Borneo
Moths of Japan